The 1991 Stanley Cup Finals was the championship series of the National Hockey League's (NHL) 1990–91 season, and the culmination of the 1991 Stanley Cup playoffs. It was contested by the Pittsburgh Penguins and the Minnesota North Stars. It was the Penguins' first Final series appearance and their first Stanley Cup victory. This is the first and only (to date) Stanley Cup Final to feature two teams from the expansion group of 1967. It was Minnesota's second Final series appearance, and their last before the franchise's relocation to Dallas two years later. It was also the first time since  that an American franchise would win the Stanley Cup. This was the first all-American finals since , which also featured the North Stars in their first appearance.

This was also the first final since  not to feature either of the two Alberta-based teams, the Calgary Flames or the Edmonton Oilers, and the first since  not contested by a team from Western Canada, or Canada overall.

The Finals and the NHL season ended on May 25, marking the last time to date that the Stanley Cup playoffs ended before the month of June.

Paths to the Finals

Minnesota defeated the first-place overall Chicago Blackhawks 4–2, the second-place overall St. Louis Blues 4–2, and the defending Cup champion Edmonton Oilers 4–1 to advance to the Finals. The North Stars became the first American team and first Norris Division team to win the Campbell Conference since the league re-aligned the divisions and adopted a divisional-based playoff format in 1981.

Pittsburgh defeated the New Jersey Devils 4–3, the Washington Capitals 4–1 and the Boston Bruins 4–2.

Game summaries
Pittsburgh centre Mario Lemieux, despite missing a game due to a back injury, recorded 12 points in 5 games to lead all scorers and won the Conn Smythe Trophy.

Lemieux scored one of the most famous goals in NHL history during the second period of game two. Receiving the puck in the Penguins' end of the ice, Lemieux skated solo into the North Stars' zone facing two defensemen (Shawn Chambers and Neil Wilkinson) as well as goaltender Jon Casey. Lemieux skirted the puck through the legs of Chambers, skated around him, baited goaltender Casey to commit left (Lemieux's right), then switched the puck to his backhand side and slid the puck into the net (before crashing into the net himself). A brief video of the goal has since been featured on Stanley Cup promotional advertisements by the NHL.

Schedule and results

Team rosters
Years indicated in boldface under the "Finals appearance" column signify that the player won the Stanley Cup in the given year.

Minnesota North Stars

Note: Neal Broten served as the North Stars acting team captain during the 1991 Stanley Cup playoffs. Curt Giles, who was injured late in the season and played in only 10 playoff games, missing the entire finals, is listed as the official team captain.

Pittsburgh Penguins

Stanley Cup engraving
The 1991 Stanley Cup was presented to Penguins captain Mario Lemieux by NHL President John Ziegler following the Penguins 8–0 win over the North Stars in game six.

The following Penguins players and staff had their names engraved on the Stanley Cup

1990–91 Pittsburgh Penguins

Broadcasting
In Canada, the series was televised in English on the CBC and in French on SRC.

In the United States, the series aired nationally on SportsChannel America. However, SportsChannel America's national coverage was blacked out in the Minnesota and Pittsburgh areas due to the local rights to North Stars and Penguins games in those respective TV markets. In Minnesota, KMSP-TV aired games one, two and five while the Midwest Sports Channel had games three, four, and six. In Pittsburgh, KBL televised games one, two and five while KDKA aired games three, four, and six. Had there been a game seven, it would have aired on KMSP-TV in Minnesota and KBL in Pittsburgh respectively.

See also
1990–91 NHL season
List of Stanley Cup champions
1990–91 Minnesota North Stars season
1990–91 Pittsburgh Penguins season

References

 
Stanley Cup
Stan
Pittsburgh Penguins games
Stanley Cup Finals
Stanley Cup Finals
Stanley Cup Finals
Ice hockey competitions in Pittsburgh
1990s in Pittsburgh
Ice hockey competitions in Minnesota
Stanley Cup Finals